Nobile Giuseppe Maria Buonaparte or Giuseppe Maria di Buonaparte (31 May 1713 – 13 December 1763) was a Corsican politician, best known as the paternal grandfather of Napoleon I of France.

Early life 
He was the son of Sebastiano Nicola Buonaparte (1683–1720) and his wife Maria Anna Tusoli (1690–1760).

Career 
In 1749, Giuseppe was the Delegate who represented the City of Ajaccio in the Council of Corte.

Marriages and children

On 5 March 1741 at Ajaccio, Giuseppe married his first wife Nobile Maria Saveria Paravicini (born 7 September 1715 at Ajaccio, died before 1750). She was a daughter of two Nobile, Giuseppe Maria Paravicini and Anna Maria Salineri. Both her parents were members of the nobility of the Republic of Genoa. They had at least four children:

Nobile Maria Getrude Buonaparte (28 November 1741, Ajaccio – December, 1793). Married at Ajaccio, 25 June 1763 Nicola Luigi Paravisini, Chancellor of the City of Ajaccio (ca. 1739, Ajaccio – 8 May 1813, Ajaccio).
Nobile Sebastiano Buonaparte (1743, Ajaccio – 24 November 1760, Ajaccio).
Nobile Carlo Buonaparte (29 March 1746 – 24 February 1785). Married in June 1764, Maria Letizia Ramolino. They were the parents of  Joseph Bonaparte, Napoleon I of France, Lucien Bonaparte, Elisa Bonaparte, Louis Bonaparte, Pauline Bonaparte, Caroline Bonaparte and Jérôme Bonaparte.
Nobile Marianna Buonaparte, died young.

Maria predeceased her husband, and he married secondly Maria Virginia Alata (born 5 February 1725), a daughter of Domenico Alata. This marriage was probably childless.

External links
 

1713 births
1763 deaths
Politicians from Ajaccio
Giuseppe Maria Buonaparte